The Souffel is a river in Alsace, France. It gave its name to two villages on its banks: Souffelweyersheim and Griesheim-sur-Souffel. Tributaries of the Souffel are Haltbach, Plaetzerbach, Musaubach, Kolbsenbach and Leisbach. In 1815 the Battle of La Suffel was fought on its banks.

References

Rivers of France
Rivers of Grand Est
Rivers of Bas-Rhin